The 1981 Syracuse Orangemen football team represented Syracuse University during the 1981 NCAA Division I-A football season. The team was led by first-year head coach Dick MacPherson and played their home games in the Carrier Dome in Syracuse, New York. Syracuse finished the season with a 4–6–1 record.

Schedule

Roster

References

Syracuse
Syracuse Orange football seasons
Syracuse Orangemen football